The mixed pair competition at the 2010 Asian Games in Guangzhou, China was held from 20 November to 22 November at the Guangzhou Chess Institute. The time was one hour (45 minutes in preliminary round) for each side and 30 seconds byoyomi for three times.

In the preliminary round, the tie-breaking system was the sum of opponents' scores (SOS), but if a second-level tie break was needed, the first-round opponents' scores were subtracted from the SOS scores.

Schedule
All times are China Standard Time (UTC+08:00)

Results
Legend
SOS — Sum of opponents scores

Preliminary round

Round 1

Round 2

Round 3

Round 4

Round 5

Round 6

Summary

Knockout round

Semifinals

Bronze medal match

Gold medal match

References 

 Official site, with details & photos of Chess, Weiqi (Go) and Xiangqi

Go at the 2010 Asian Games